The Roman Catholic Diocese of Catarman (Lat: Dioecesis Catarmaniensis) is a Roman Rite diocese of the Latin Church of the Catholic Church in the Philippines.

Erected in 1974, the diocese is a suffragan of the Archdiocese of Palo and has experienced no jurisdictional changes since its establishment.

The current bishop is Emmanuel Trance, the diocese's coadjutor bishop before automatically succeeding Angel Hobayan due to the latter's retirement in 2005. Trance hails from Calinog, Iloilo under the Archdiocese of Jaro.

Ordinaries

See also
Catholic Church in the Philippines

References

Catarman
Catarman
Religion in Northern Samar